Sebastian Toby M. Pugh (born 26 February 1992), known professionally as Toby Sebastian, is a British actor and musician. He is best known for portraying the character of Trystane Martell in the HBO series Game of Thrones, and Andrea Bocelli in the biopic The Music of Silence.

Early life
Sebastian was born in Oxford but lived in Andalusia, Spain, with his three sisters (all actresses): Florence, Arabella, and Rafaela for three years from 1999-2002. His father, Clinton Pugh, is a restaurateur and designer. His mother Deborah is a dance teacher.

Career
Sebastian first appeared on TV as a contestant on Orange unsignedAct in 2008. Sebastian performed as a singer-songwriter, performing his own songs as part of a competition to win a £60,000 recording contract, but did not make the final. Following the show, he left school for a record deal with A&M records (Universal) and spent years between London, Los Angeles and Nashville where he recorded his debut album with award-winning country producer Chris Lindsey.

In 2012, he landed his first acting role in the film, After the Dark. He also appeared in The Red Tent as Re-mose, in Barely Lethal (alongside Hailee Steinfeld, Sophie Turner and Thomas Mann) as Cash Fenton. In the same movie, Sebastian contributed five original songs to the soundtrack.

In 2015, Sebastian was cast in the fifth season of Game of Thrones as Trystane Martell. Game of Thrones casting director Nina Gold later explained his casting in the series: "We knew Toby more because he'd done a lot of music things in the past, but he has a really romantic feel that just worked."

Sebastian portrayed Andrea Bocelli in the biopic The Music of Silence, alongside Antonio Banderas and Jordi Mollà directed by the Academy Award nominated director Michael Radford.

In 2017, Sebastian starred in the feature film Trading Paint (also released as Burning Rubber) a sports film starring John Travolta, Michael Madsen and Shania Twain, directed by Karzan Kader.

In 2019, Sebastian released an EP titled Hamliar produced by Matthew Benbrook, a producer affiliated to artists such as Dido, Paolo Nutini and Ed Drewitt.

Filmography

Film

Television

Discography

References

External links
 

1992 births
Living people
21st-century English male actors
English male television actors
English male film actors
Actors from Oxford